Atractus microrhynchus is a species of snake in the family Colubridae. The species can be found in Ecuador and Peru. It was described in 1868 by Edward Drinker Cope, an American zoologist.

References 

Atractus
Reptiles of Ecuador
Reptiles of Peru
Reptiles described in 1868
Taxa named by Edward Drinker Cope